Llandybie railway station serves the village of Llandybie near Ammanford, Carmarthenshire. The railway station is located below street level just off Kings Road. This is a convenient stop for Glynhir Estate and Glynhir Falls. Two miles from the station is the Llandybie 18-hole golf course.

All trains serving the station are operated by Transport for Wales. For trains travelling south this is a request stop, but those travelling north have to make a mandatory call so that the train driver can press the plunger on the platform that activates the warning lights & barriers at the adjacent level crossing over the A483 prior to departure.

When the original station was replaced, the signal box was saved and can be found on the Gwili Railway at Bronwydd Arms.

Facilities
Amenities at the station are basic. There is no ticket provision (so all tickets have to be purchased on the train or in advance) and only a single stone waiting shelter is provided, along with timetable poster board, Digital CIS display and customer help point next to the station entrance. Step-free access is available from the car park to the platform, but the connecting ramp is quite steep and assistance may be required for disabled passengers wishing to travel from here.

Services
There are four trains a day to Shrewsbury northbound from Monday to Saturday (plus a fifth to ) and five southbound to Llanelli & Swansea (the first train in each direction does not run on Saturdays); two services each way call on Sundays.

References

External links 

Railway stations in Carmarthenshire
DfT Category F2 stations
Former Great Western Railway stations
Railway stations in Great Britain opened in 1857
Heart of Wales Line
Railway stations served by Transport for Wales Rail
Railway request stops in Great Britain
1857 establishments in Wales